Tade may refer to
Tade (name)
Tade, Estonia, a village
Mazsola és Tádé, a Hungarian puppet animated film made around 1970
Persicaria hydropiper, or water pepper, known in Japanese as tade.